Below are the results for season 2 of the North American Poker Tour (NAPT).

Results

PokerStars Caribbean Adventure
 Casino: Atlantis Resort, Bahamas
 Buy-in: $10,000 + $300
 7-Day Event: January 8, 2011 to January 15, 2011
 Number of buy-ins: 1,560
 Total Prize Pool: $15,132,000
 Number of Payouts: 232

NAPT Mohegan Sun
 Casino: Mohegan Sun, Uncasville, Connecticut
 Buy-in: $5,000
 5-Day Event: April 9, 2011 to April 13, 2011
 Number of buy-ins: 387
 Total Prize Pool: $1,764,330
 Number of Payouts: 56

The winner of this same event in Season 1, Vanessa Selbst, repeats as the Season 2 winner.

Suspension

On April 15, 2011, along with similar competitors' sites, the NAPT's affiliated website, Pokerstars.com, was seized and shut down by U.S. Attorney's Office for the Southern District of New York, which alleged that PokerStars was in violation of federal bank fraud and money laundering laws.  The company subsequently stopped allowing players from the United States to play real money games.

As of February 13, 2012, the NAPT website, and information on remaining events for Season 2, has not been updated since the April 15, 2011 seizure.

As of March 3, 2012 (possibly earlier), the NAPT website no longer shows the North American series—redirecting instead to information regarding the Latin American Poker Tour.

References

External links
Official site

North American Poker Tour
2011 in poker

bg:Северноамерикански покер тур